Martin Fisher was a politician.

Martin Fisher may also refer to:

Martin Fisher (actor) on List of EastEnders characters
Marty Fisher, Martin 'Marty' Fisher, Shameless fictional character
Computer technology for developing areas#Martin Fisher: a possible business plan
Martin Fisher (zoologist), see Silver Medal
Martin Fisher (inventor), see Lemelson–MIT Prize

See also
Martin Fischer (disambiguation)